Marko Škop (born 1974 in Prešov, Slovakia) is a Slovak film director.

He received degrees in journalism at Comenius University in Bratislava in 1996 and in film directing at the Academy of Performing Arts in Bratislava in 2001. He gained his PhD in Mass Media from the Faculty of Philosophy at Comenius University in Bratislava in 2005.

Awards 
At the Karlovy Vary International Film Festival, Other Worlds received the "Audience Award" and "Special Mention of the Jury" in 2006, and Osadné was awarded "Best Documentary" in 2009.

At the BFI London Film Festival, Osadné was nominated for the "Grierson Award" in 2009.

At the 2015 Toronto International Film Festival, Eva Nová won the prize of the International Federation of Film Critics (FIPRESCI) for the Discovery programme.

Filmography 
 2006: Other Worlds / Iné svety 
 2008: Blind Loves / Slepé lásky (Producer) 
 2009: Osadné
 2012: New Life of Family Album / Nový život (Producer)
 2013: Miracle / Zázrak (Producer)
 2015: Eva Nová  (Director / Writer / Producer)
 2019 : Let There Be Light (Director / Producer)

References

External links

1974 births
Living people
People from Prešov
Slovak film directors
Sun in a Net Awards winners